KQE or kqe may refer to:

 KQE, the Indian Railways station code for Kala Akhar railway station, Madhya Pradesh, India
 kqe, the ISO 639-3 code for Kalagan language, Philippines